is a former Japanese football player.

Club career
Fujigaya was born in Hamamatsu on 13 February 1981. After graduating from high school, he joined Consadole Sapporo in 1999. He became a regular goalkeeper instead Yohei Sato from 2003. He moved to Gamba Osaka in 2005. He played many matches as regular goalkeeper for a long time. The club won the champions 2005 J1 League, 2007 J.League Cup, 2008 and 2009 Emperor's Cup. In Asia, the club won the champions 2008 AFC Champions League. However the club was relegated to J2 League end of 2012 season. In 2013 season, he played full-time in all matches and the club was promoted to J1 League. However he left the club and moved to his local club Júbilo Iwata in 2014. He returned to Gamba Osaka in 2015. However he could hardly play in the match behind Masaaki Higashiguchi and retired end of 2017 season.

National team career
In June 2001, Fujigaya was elected Japan U-20 national team for 2001 World Youth Championship. At this tournament, he played full-time in all 3 matches.

Club statistics

1 = Japanese Super Cup and Suruga Bank Championship appearances.

Honors
 AFC Champions League: 2008
 Pan-Pacific Championship: 2008
 J1 League: 2005
 J2 League: 2013
 Emperor's Cup: 2008, 2009, 2015
 J.League Cup: 2007
 Japanese Super Cup - 2015

References

External links

1981 births
Living people
Association football people from Shizuoka Prefecture
Japanese footballers
Japan youth international footballers
J1 League players
J2 League players
J3 League players
Hokkaido Consadole Sapporo players
Gamba Osaka players
Gamba Osaka U-23 players
Júbilo Iwata players
Asian Games medalists in football
Footballers at the 2002 Asian Games
Asian Games silver medalists for Japan
Association football goalkeepers
Medalists at the 2002 Asian Games